Jakupica or Mokra is a mountain range in the central part of North Macedonia. The headwaters of the Axios river, mentioned by Homer (Il. 21.141, Il. 2.849) as the home of the Paeonians allies of Troy, spring from its flanks.

Geography
The highest peak is Solunska Glava . Other significant peaks are: Karadžica (2,473 m), Popovo Brdo (2,380 m), Ostar Breg (2,365 m), Ubava (2,353 m), Ostar Vrv (2,275 m), and Dautica (2,178 m). The mountain range can be easily approached from the capital Skopje, or from the town of Veles and many villages in the area. On clear days, from the peak Solunska Glava, one can see the city of Thessaloniki in Greece.

Environment
The relief is criss-crossed by numerous clear and fast mountain rivers. Large areas are covered with beech, oak, and conifer forests. There are also obvious traces of the primeval glaciation from the diluvial period. A number of institutions have been recommending this area (as well as the Šar Mountains) as a national park. A 19,600 ha area of the mountain range has been designated an Important Bird Area (IBA) by BirdLife International because it supports populations of golden eagles, yellow-billed choughs, wallcreepers and alpine accentors.

See also 
 List of mountains in North Macedonia
 List of non-Alpine European Ultras

References

External links 
 
 Mount Jakupica on Youtube

Mountain ranges of Europe
Mountain ranges of North Macedonia
Two-thousanders of North Macedonia
Important Bird Areas of North Macedonia